Kathryn Cholette is a Canadian politician who served as leader of the Green Party of Canada from 1988 to 1990. Just prior to the end of her term as leader, Cholette publicly resigned her post in an article entitled "Why I Left the Green Party". She was the first woman elected to lead a federal political party in Canada, preceding Audrey McLaughlin by a year.

Cholette was a co-coordinator (with Frank Cox and Kel Kelly) of the Tin Wis Coalition in British Columbia. The Tin Wis Coalition brought together First Nations peoples, labour unions and environmental groups to discuss the concerns they held in common, such as forestry issues. She was an early activist in the Green Cities Movement in Vancouver, including the effort to create a sustainable community in Vancouver's South False Creek area. She served as editor of the EcoCity Section of the national magazine "New City", was on the founding Steering Committee of Village Vancouver Transition Society, and is on the Board of Directors of New City Institute (NCI).
 
Cholette has a Social Service Worker Certificate, Douglas College, a Permaculture Design Certificate, a BA in Anthropology and Sociology, SFU, and a Master of Liberal Studies, SFU.   Her Masters project explored the blocks and pathways to sustainability in key western institutions and political ideologies. She studied New Economics at Schumacher College.

References

Green Party of Canada leaders
Female Canadian political party leaders
Year of birth missing (living people)
Living people
Simon Fraser University alumni
Canadian women in federal politics